Hans de Weers (17 April 1966) is a Dutch television- and film producer. Apart from box office hits like Oysters at Nam Kee's and New Kids Turbo he is most notable for producing the film Antonia's Line that enjoyed critical success and several awards, including the Academy Award for Best Foreign Language Film at the 68th Academy Awards.

Selected filmography

Feature films
 Oude Tongen (1994)
 Antonia's Line (1995)
 The Stowaway (1997)
 House of America (1997)
 Mariken (2000)
 Nynke (2001)
 Oysters at Nam Kee's (2002)
 Erik of het klein insectenboek (2004)
 Duska (2007)
 De Brief voor de Koning (2008)
 Stricken (2009)
 The Happy Housewife (2010)
 Dik Trom (2010)
 New Kids Turbo (2010)
 Nova Zembla (2011)
 New Kids Nitro (2011)
 Jackie (2012)
 De Marathon (2012)
 The Dinner (2013)
 The Surprise (2015)
 Hotel de grote L (2017)
 Tulipani, Love, Honour and a Bicycle (2017)
 La Holandesa (2017)
 Believe the Movie (announced)

Television films 

 De Trein van zes uur tien (1999)
 Maten (1999)
 Ochtendzwemmers (2001)
 De ordening (2003)
 Bluebird (2004)
 De Overloper (2012)

Television series
 Meiden van de Wit (2002 – 2005, 36 episodes)
 Flikken Maastricht (2007 – 2012, 41 episodes)
 Dokter Deen (2012 – 2018, 34 episodes)
 Tokyo Trial (2017, 4 episodes)

References

External links
 Official website
 

Living people
Dutch film producers
Dutch television producers
University of Amsterdam alumni
1966 births